Bleeck or van Bleeck is a surname, and may refer to:

 Arthur Henry Bleeck (1829–1877), British orientalist
 Oliver Bleeck, pseudonym of Ross Thomas (author)
 Peter van Bleeck (baptized 1697 – 1764), Dutch portrait painter and engraver
 Richard van Bleeck (1670–1733), Dutch painter